Evan Paul Moon  (born 18 October 1968) is a New Zealand historian and a professor at the Auckland University of Technology. He is a writer of New Zealand history and biography, specialising in Māori history, the Treaty of Waitangi and the early period of Crown rule.

Education 
Moon holds a Bachelor of Arts degree in history and political studies, a Master of Philosophy degree with distinction, a Master of Arts degree with honours, a PhD, and a Doctor of Literature degree. In 2003, he was elected as a Fellow of the Royal Historical Society at University College London, and is also a Fellow of the Royal Society of Arts.

Career 
Moon is recognised for his study of the Treaty of Waitangi, and has published two books on the topic. He has also produced the biographies of Governors William Hobson and Robert FitzRoy, and the Ngā Puhi chief Hone Heke. In 2003, he published the book Tohunga: Hohepa Kereopa, an explication regarding tohunga of the Ngāi Tūhoe. He has also written a major biography of the Ngā Puhi politician and Kotahitanga leader Hone Heke Ngapua (1869–1909), and wrote Fatal Frontiers – a history of New Zealand in the 1830s. In addition to writing books, Moon is a frequent contributor to national and international academic journals on a variety of history-related topics.

Currently, Moon is professor of history at  Auckland University of Technology's Te Ara Poutama, the Faculty of Māori Development, where he has taught since 1993.

In the 2022 New Year Honours, Moon was appointed an Officer of the New Zealand Order of Merit, for services to education and historical research.

Media appearances

Moon has appeared on TVNZ's Frontier of Dreams programme explaining the history of the Waitangi Treaty, on Prime TV's New Zealand's Top 100 History Makers programme, on TVNZ's Close Up, Marae, Te Karere, and Waka Huia programmes, on TV3 News, on Sky News Australia, and on Māori Television as an election night analyst. He is a frequent commentator on Treaty-related issues on Radio New Zealand's Morning Report programme, on Newstalk ZB, Radio Pacific, and Radio Live.

Controversies

Moon's criticism of Bishop Pompallier

Moon's 2001 biography of Hone Heke caused a major controversy because of its treatment of Bishop Jean Baptiste Pompallier, whom Moon described as 'seditious' and 'treasonous' – a view fellow historian Michael King rejected as "Absolute nonsense...reflecting the anti-Catholic prejudices widespread among Protestant missionaries at the time".

Māori cannibalism

Moon's 2008 book This Horrid Practice, in which he discusses cannibalism amongst historical Māori, has also drawn  criticism. It sparked accusations that Moon was demonising Māori, and some argued the book was "a return to Victorian values". Moon responded in a newspaper article in which he accused the critics of the book of attempting to censor him. He also was critical of some of the superficial commentaries made by particular academics, and noted that many people had criticised the book before it had even been released.

Heke's flagpole
In 2009 the auction firm Dunbar Sloane announced its intention to sell a piece of wood allegedly taken from the flagpole Hōne Heke chopped down at Russell in the mid-1840s.  Moon was asked for a professional opinion and stated that the piece of wood was almost certainly a late nineteenth century fake.  The item was withdrawn from auction, but sold privately to the Russell Museum later in the year for an undisclosed sum.

Personal

Family
Moon was born in Auckland, the son of Evan Moon, a solicitor, and Dragica Moon (née Pavličević) who emigrated to New Zealand from Montenegro in 1966.  His father's family came to New Zealand from Sussex, in the mid-1880s, and was involved in the establishment of the Auckland Star newspaper.

Religion
Moon identifies as a Congregationalist, and in July 2007 completed a history of Three Kings Congregational Church, in Mt. Roskill, Auckland, for its centenary. Moon's wife, Milica, is Serbian Orthodox.

Books by Paul Moon

References

External links
 Paul Moon – staff profile at the Auckland University of Technology

1968 births
Living people
New Zealand Congregationalists
Academic staff of the Auckland University of Technology
20th-century New Zealand historians
New Zealand biographers
Male biographers
Writers from Auckland
People educated at Massey High School
New Zealand people of English descent
New Zealand people of Montenegrin descent
Officers of the New Zealand Order of Merit
21st-century New Zealand historians